is a song performed by Japanese recording artist Arisa Mizuki, featured as the seventh track on her third compilation album, Fiore II. It was released on April 20, 1996 as the second single from the album. Written by Chika Ueda, the song served as ending theme for the final season of the TV Asahi anime Sailor Moon, Sailor Stars. Two versions of the song were used on the show: an initial version, arranged by Takao Konishi (episodes 167-172), and the actual single version (episodes 173-199), arranged by Hiroyuki Ōtsuki.

Chart performance 
"Kaze mo Sora mo Kitto..." debuted on the Oricon Weekly Singles chart at number 24 with 14,130 copies sold in its first week. The single charted for three weeks and has sold a total of 27,530 copies.

Track listing

Charts and sales

References 

Sailor Moon songs
1996 singles
Alisa Mizuki songs
1996 songs